Sweden competed in Eurovision Song Contest 1966 with the song "Nygammal vals" performed by Lill Lindfors and Svante Thuresson. It was written by Bengt-Arne Wallin and Björn Lindroth. Much thanks to Scandinavian neighbours, Sweden took their best placement so far in ESC this year, held in Luxembourg, with 16 points and a 2nd place.

Before Eurovision

Melodifestivalen 1966
Melodifestivalen 1966 (known as the Svensk sångfinal) was the selection for the eighth song to represent Sweden at the Eurovision Song Contest, held at the Cirkus in Stockholm on 29 January 1966. It was the seventh time that this system of picking a song had been used. 898 songs were submitted to SVT for the competition. Regional juries selected the winning song. The final was held in the Cirkus in Stockholm on 29 January 1966, hosted by Sven Lindahl and was broadcast on Sveriges Radio TV but was not broadcast on radio.

At Eurovision

Voting

References

External links
ESCSweden.com (in Swedish)
Information site about Melodifestivalen
Eurovision Song Contest National Finals

1966
Countries in the Eurovision Song Contest 1966
1966
Eurovision
Eurovision